Lysinuric protein intolerance (LPI) is an autosomal recessive metabolic disorder affecting amino acid transport.

About 140 patients have been reported, almost half of them of Finnish origin. Individuals from Japan, Italy, Morocco and North Africa have also been reported plus one in Bixby, Oklahoma.

Signs and symptoms
Infants with LPI are usually symptom-free when breastfed because of the low protein concentration in human milk, but develop vomiting and diarrhea after weaning. The patients show failure to thrive, poor appetite, growth retardation, enlarged liver and spleen, prominent osteoporosis and osteopenia, delayed bone age and spontaneous protein aversion. Forced feeding of protein may lead to convulsions and coma. Mental development is normal if prolonged episode of hyperammonemia can be avoided. Some patients develop severe pulmonary and kidney complications. High levels of plasma glutamine and glycine are observed.

Causes
It has been associated with SLC7A7.

Mechanism

In LPI, urinary excretion of cationic amino acids (ornithine, arginine and lysine) is increased and these amino acids are poorly absorbed from the intestine. Therefore, their plasma concentrations are low and their body pools become depleted. Deficiency of arginine and ornithine restricts the function of the urea cycle and leads to hyperammonemia after protein-rich meals. Deficiency of lysine may play a major role in the skeletal and immunological abnormalities observed in LPI patients.

Diagnosis

The diagnosis is based on the biochemical findings (increased concentrations of lysine, arginine and ornithine in urine and low concentrations of these amino acids in plasma, elevation of urinary orotic acid excretion after protein-rich meals, and inappropriately high concentrations of serum ferritin and lactate dehydrogenase isoenzymes) and the screening of known mutations of the causative gene from a DNA sample.

Treatment
Treatment of LPI consists of protein-restricted diet and supplementation with oral *GeneReview/NIH/UW entry on Lysinuric Protein Intolerance citrulline. Citrulline is a neutral amino acid that improves the function of the urea cycle and allows sufficient protein intake without hyperammonemia.

Prognosis
Under proper dietary control and supplementation, the majority of the LPI patients are able to have a nearly normal life. However, severe complications including pulmonary alveolar proteinosis and chronic kidney disease may develop even with proper treatment.Fertility appears to be normal in women, but mothers with LPI have an increased risk for complications during pregnancy and delivery.

References

External links 
 GeneReview/NIH/UW entry on Lysinuric Protein Intolerance

Amino acid metabolism disorders
Autosomal recessive disorders
Membrane transport protein disorders
Rare diseases